Sara Martín Martín (born 22 March 1999) is a Spanish professional racing cyclist, who currently rides for UCI Women's WorldTeam .

Major results

2017
 National Junior Road Championships
1st  Road race
1st  Time trial
2018
 6th Time trial, Mediterranean Games
 10th Road race, National Road Championships
2019
 2nd Time trial, National Under–23 Road Championships
 8th La Périgord Ladies
 9th Time trial, National Road Championships
2020
 National Road Championships
2nd Time trial
5th Road race
2021
 7th Ronde de Mouscron

References

External links
 

1999 births
Living people
Spanish female cyclists
Sportspeople from the Province of Burgos
Cyclists from Castile and León